Merta may refer to:
Merta (river), a creek in Moravia, a tributary of the Desná
Merta City, a municipality in Nagaur district, Rajasthan, India
Merta (Rajasthan Assembly constituency)

People
František Merta (born 1951), Czech priest convicted of indecent assault
Tomasz Merta (1965–2010), Polish historian and politician
Vladimír Merta (born 1946), Czech folk singer-songwriter
Merta Sterling (1883–1944), American silent film comedy actress

See also
Battle of Merta, 1790, between the Maratha Empire and the Rajputs of Jodhpur
3303 Merta, a minor planet